Jung Kwang-Seok (born December 1, 1970) is a retired South Korean football player and football manager. He is managing Korea National League side Yongin City FC.

He was the member of South Korea U-23 in 1992 Summer Olympics and the member of South Korea in 1990 Asian Games and 1990 Dynasty Cup.

Honors

Club
Busan Daewoo Royals
 K-League Cup Champions (1) : 1997
 Supplementary League Cup Champions (1) : 1998

National team
South Korea
 Dynasty Cup Champions (1) : 1990
 Asian Games Bronze medal (1) : 1990

Individual
K-League Rookie of the Year : 1993

Club career statistics

References

External links
 FIFA Player Statistics
 

1970 births
Living people
South Korean footballers
South Korean football managers
Association football defenders
South Korea international footballers
Footballers at the 1992 Summer Olympics
Olympic footballers of South Korea
K League 1 players
Busan IPark players
Gimcheon Sangmu FC players
Sungkyunkwan University alumni
Asian Games medalists in football
Footballers at the 1990 Asian Games
Asian Games bronze medalists for South Korea
Medalists at the 1990 Asian Games